This article lists the complete results of the group stage of the 2014 BWF World Junior Championships – Teams event in Alor Setar, Malaysia.

Group W1

South Korea vs Botswana

Singapore vs Mongolia

South Korea vs Mongolia

Singapore vs Botswana

South Korea vs Singapore

Mongolia vs Botswana

Group W2

Thailand vs Netherlands

Russia vs South Africa

Thailand vs South Africa

Russia vs Netherlands

Thailand vs Russia

South Africa vs Netherlands

Group X1

Indonesia vs Sri Lanka

Germany vs Canada

Indonesia vs Canada

Germany vs Sri Lanka

Indonesia vs Germany

Canada vs Sri Lanka

Group X2

Bulgaria vs Czech Republic

Macau vs Philippines

Hong Kong vs Czech Republic

Bulgaria vs Philippines

Hong Kong vs Macau

Hong Kong vs Philippines

Bulgaria vs Macau

Hong Kong vs Bulgaria

Macau vs Czech Republic

Philippines vs Czech Republic

Group Y1

Japan vs Spain

France vs Armenia

Japan vs Armenia

France vs Spain

Japan vs France

Armenia vs Spain

Group Y2

England vs Egypt

Denmark vs Egypt

Chinese Taipei vs England

Chinese Taipei vs Egypt

Denmark vs England

Chinese Taipei vs Denmark

Group Z1

China vs Slovenia

Vietnam vs USA

China vs USA

Vietnam vs Slovenia

China vs Vietnam

USA vs Slovenia

Group Z2

India vs Australia

Malaysia vs Australia

Malaysia vs Uzbekistan

India vs Uzbekistan

Malaysia vs India

Uzbekistan vs Australia

References

2014 BWF World Junior Championships
2014 in youth sport